Sofie Oyen (born 4 February 1992) is a Belgian former tennis player.

In her career, Leopoldsburg-born Oyen won three singles titles and three doubles titles on the ITF Women's Circuit. On 23 August 2010, she reached her best singles ranking of world number 403. On 21 December 2015, she peaked at number 526 in the WTA doubles rankings.

Playing for Belgium at the Fed Cup, Oyen has a win–loss record of 0–2.

ITF finals

Singles (3–5)

Doubles (3–4)

Fed Cup participation

Doubles

References

External links
 
 
 

1992 births
Living people
Sportspeople from Limburg (Belgium)
Belgian female tennis players
Florida Gators women's tennis players
21st-century Belgian women